Touch Dictionary (Teochi Digsyeoneoli) (formerly known as Touch Dic) is a dictionary software title for the Nintendo DS released in 2005 exclusively in South Korea.

Features

The dictionary offers translation to and from English, Japanese, and Korean. An advertisement for the game claims it offers 1.63 million words.

The user enters the word to translate from the source language using the keyboard on the bottom screen. Above the keyboard, a list of possible source words is displayed. The top screen displays the results of the search. The user can scroll between results using an on-screen scroll wheel on the right side of the lower screen.

Additionally, the software has a calculator.

Development and release
The title was developed by YBM Sisa, a company that primarily creates English software for teaching people English. It was published by Daiwon C&A Holdings, now known as Daewon Media. The name was changed from Touch Dic to Touch Dictionary for release due to Western audiences mocking the original name for being unintentionally and comically vulgar. It was released only in South Korea. A Korean video advertisement for Touch Dictionary uses the phrase "" as a slogan. Roughly translated, it means "Words stimulate."

Sony Computer Entertainment Korea produced a similar game, Hand Dictionary (also known as Hand Dic) for release for the PlayStation Portable.

References

2005 video games
Nintendo DS games
Nintendo DS-only games
Language learning video games
Dictionary software
South Korea-exclusive video games
Video games developed in South Korea